Marjorie Bonner (died 1895), the stage name of Catherine F. Goodwin, was a 19th-century American stage actress.

In 1883 she was in the Rhea Company of actors.  Monte Cristo was presented by the National Theatre in December. Actor James O'Neill performed the leading role with Frederic De Belleville playing Noirlier. The female characters were of lesser significance in the play but were rendered convincingly by Bonner, Eugenie Blair, and Annie Boudinot.

In May 1885 Bonner acted the part of Cicely Blaine, the heroine in Galley Slave, adapted from the writing of Bartley Campbell. The plot of the play dealt with impediments in the path of love. The characters were Americans traveling in Europe. The settings included Venice, Italy, Rome, Italy, and different parts of France. Bonner often played second to actress Margaret Mather.

Her appearance was compared to Lily Langtry and she was called "The New Jersey Lily".

Death
Bonner was found dead in her New York City apartment on November 15, 1895, the apparent victim of a morphine overdose. She was survived by her sister, Myra Goodwin, who was also an actress. She was 33 years old at the time of her death.

References

19th-century American actresses
American stage actresses
1895 deaths
Year of birth unknown
Date of death unknown
Place of birth unknown